

List of winners
The following is a list of winners of the Golden Arena for Best Cinematography at the Pula Film Festival.

Yugoslav competition (1955–1990)

Croatian competition (1992–present)

Notes

A.  Although the festival was opened on 26 July 1991 and a press screening of Zrinko Ogresta's film Fragments: Chronicle of a Vanishing was held, the festival board presided by Antun Vrdoljak decided to cancel the festival, as a sign of protest against violence related to the Ten-Day War in Slovenia and the initial stages of the Croatian War of Independence. Nine films were supposed to be screened in the competition program.
B. : The awards ceremony was cancelled in 1994 as only one Croatian feature film was made in the preceding 12 months (Bogdan Žižić's The Price of Life). The festival was held in spite of this, but the usual competition program was replaced by screenings of the classic works of the Zagreb School of Animated Film and documentaries, while the main program featured premieres of six American movies.

Multiple winners
The following cinematographers have received multiple awards. Years in bold indicate wins in Yugoslav competition (1955–1990).

8 :  Tomislav Pinter (1964, 1965, 1966, 1967, 1979, 1981, 1989, 1995)
5 :  Goran Trbuljak (1984, 1986, 1992, 1997, 1998)
4 :  Aleksandar Sekulović (1956, 1957, 1959, 1962)
4 :  Mirko Pivčević (2001, 2004, 2007, 2009)
3 :  Živko Zalar (1978, 1983, 2003)
3 :  Vjekoslav Vrdoljak (1996, 1999, 2005)
2 :  Frano Vodopivec (1955, 1969)

2 :  Rudi Vavpotič (1961, 1970)
2 :  Mišo Samoilovski (1972, 1980)
2 :  Božidar Nikolić (1977, 1985)
2 :  Nenad Jovičić (1957, 1974)
2 :  Branko Blažina (1973, 1976)
2 :  Slobodan Trninić (1993, 2010)

See also
Cinema of Yugoslavia
Cinema of Croatia

References

External links
Web archive 1954–2010 at the Pula Film Festival official website 

Pula Film Festival
Awards for best cinematography